Slave raiding is a military raid for the purpose of capturing people and bringing them from the raid area to serve as slaves. Once seen as a normal part of warfare, it is nowadays widely considered a crime.  Slave raiding has occurred since antiquity. Some of the earliest surviving written records of slave raiding come from Sumer (in present-day Iraq). Kidnapping and prisoners of war was the most common source of African slaves, although indentured servitude or punishment also resulted in slavery.

The many alternative methods of obtaining human beings to work in indentured or other involuntary conditions, as well as technological and cultural changes, have made slave raiding rarer.

Reasons 
Slave raiding was a violent  method of economic development where a resource shortage was addressed with the acquisition by force of the desired resource, in this case human labor. Other than the element of slavery being present, such violent seizure of a resource does not differ from similar raids to gain food or any other desired commodity.

Slave raiding was a large and lucrative trade on the coasts of Africa, in ancient Europe, Mesoamerica, and in medieval Asia. The Crimean–Nogai slave raids in Eastern Europe provided some two or three million slaves to the Ottoman Empire over the course of four centuries. The Barbary pirates from the 16th century onwards through 1830 engaged in razzias in Africa and the European coastal areas as far away as Iceland, capturing slaves for the Muslim slavery market in North Africa and the Middle East. The Atlantic slave trade was predicated on European countries endorsing and supporting slave raiding between African tribes to supply the workforce of agricultural plantations in the Americas.

Methods 
The act of slave raiding involves an organised and concerted attack on a settlement with the purpose of taking the area's people. The collected new slaves are often kept in some form of slave pen or depot. From there, the slave takers will transport them to a distant place by means such as a slave ship or camel caravan. When conquered people are enslaved and remain in their place, it is not raiding.

Historically

Barbary slave trade 

European slaves were acquired by Barbary pirates in slave raids on ships and by raids on coastal towns from Italy to the Netherlands, Ireland and the southwest of Britain, as far north as Iceland and into the Eastern Mediterranean. On some occasions, settlements such as Baltimore in Ireland were abandoned following a raid, only being resettled many years later.

Spanish slave raiding in Chile 

Although there was a general ban of slavery of indigenous people by Spanish Crown the 1598–1604 Mapuche uprising that ended with the Destruction of the Seven Cities made the Spanish in 1608 declare slavery legal for those Mapuches caught in war. Mapuches "rebels" were considered Christian apostates and could therefore be enslaved according to the church teachings of the day. In reality these legal changes only formalized Mapuche slavery that was already occurring at the time, with captured Mapuches being treated as property in the way that they were bought and sold among the Spanish. Legalisation made Spanish slave raiding increasingly common in the Arauco War. Mapuche slaves were exported north to places such as La Serena and Lima.  The Mapuche uprising of 1655 had parts of its background in the slave hunting expeditions of Juan de Salazar, including his failed 1654 expedition. Slavery for Mapuches "caught in war" was abolished in 1683 after decades of legal attempts by the Spanish Crown to suppress it.

Vikings in Ireland 
The Vikings raided the coastlines of Ireland for people, cattle and goods, high status captives were taken to be ransomed back to the community or families, this included bishops and kings. In the Annals of Ulster it is recorded that in 821 AD Howth, was raided and "a great booty of women was carried away". By the tenth and eleventh centuries the Vikings had established slave markets in Ireland's major ports. However, following political allegiances with the Vikings, the Irish Kings also took local captives to profit from these slave markets. By the late tenth century, the Vikings began to suffer significant military defeats and the Irish Kings now seized captives from the defeated Viking armies and their captured towns, with the justification that the inhabitants were foreigners bearing the sins of their ancestors.

West African Coastlines 
Raiding villages was also a method of capturing slaves in Africa, and accounted for the overwhelming majority of West African slaves. While there was some slave raiding along the African coasts by Europeans, much of the raiding that took place was performed by other West Africans powers. Gomes Eannes de Azurara, who witnessed a Portuguese raid noted that some captives drowned themselves, others hid in under their huts, and others hid their children among the seaweed. Portuguese coastal raiders found that raiding was too costly and often ineffective and opted for established commercial relations.

The increase in the demand for slaves due to the expansion of European colonial powers to the New World made the slave trade much more lucrative to the West African powers, leading to the establishment of a number of actual West African empires thriving on the slave trade. These included the Bono State, Oyo empire (Yoruba), Kong Empire, Imamate of Futa Jallon, Imamate of Futa Toro, Kingdom of Koya, Kingdom of Khasso, Kingdom of Kaabu, Fante Confederacy, Ashanti Confederacy, and the kingdom of Dahomey. These kingdoms relied on a militaristic culture of constant warfare to generate the great numbers of human captives required for trade with the Europeans.

South African Republic and the Boer Republics 
The practice of slavery and slave raiding also took place along the borders of the South African Republic by the Boers up until at least 1870. West Transvaal Boers procured women and children as slaves and used them as domestic servants and plantation workers. Boer slave raids in the South African Republic were regular and the number captured totaled in the thousands. This is despite the prohibition of slavery north of the Vaal River under the 1852 Sand River Convention.

See also 
 Abduction
 Bride kidnapping
 Blackbirding
 Crimean-Nogai raids into East Slavic lands
 Turkish Abductions
 Shanghaiing

References

Bibliography

Slave trade
War crimes by type
Kidnapping